Mekhi Phifer (born December 29, 1974) is an American actor. He portrayed Dr. Greg Pratt on NBC's long-running medical drama ER until 2008 and had a co-starring role opposite actor/rapper Eminem in the 2002 feature film 8 Mile. He was a recurring cast member on the Fox crime show Lie to Me in the role of Ben Reynolds before season 3, and also starred as CIA officer Rex Matheson in Torchwood: Miracle Day.

Early life 

Phifer was born in Harlem, New York City. He grew up in a single-parent household with his mother, Rhoda Phifer, a high-school teacher.

Career
In 1994, 18-year-old Phifer attended an open-casting call for director Spike Lee's Clockers, beating over a thousand others to get the lead role as a narcotics dealer embroiled in a murder cover-up. He followed that role with another in the comedy spoof feature High School High (which also starred his former wife Malinda Williams) and continued by co-starring in the horror film I Still Know What You Did Last Summer, starring Jennifer Love Hewitt and Freddie Prinze Jr. He also starred in the film Paid in Full in 2002.

He portrayed Dr. Gregory Pratt on the NBC medical drama ER, which he introduced in April 2002. Phifer left the show in September 2008, in the first episode of Season 15. His character died during the conclusion of the season 14 finale cliffhanger involving an ambulance explosion that was rigged to kill an injured FBI informant (Steve Buscemi). During his six years in the show, he was nominated twice for an NAACP Image Award.

Phifer's television credits include the movies The Tuskegee Airmen (1995), HBO's Subway Stories: Tales from the Underground (1997), and Brian's Song (2001 film) as former Chicago Bear Gale Sayers. He received additional notice for his performance opposite singer Beyoncé Knowles (from Destiny's Child) on MTV's alternative take on the Carmen legend with the movie Carmen: A Hip Hopera (2001).

Phifer had a recurring guest role in the fifth and sixth seasons of Homicide: Life on the Street, portraying "Junior Bunk", the troubled nephew of Baltimore drug lord Luther Mahoney, and also guest-starred in New York Undercover. He earned an NAACP Image Award nomination for the TV movie, A Lesson Before Dying, opposite Don Cheadle. In 2009, Phifer began a guest-starring arc on the Fox drama Lie to Me.

Among Phifer's other big-screen credits are Soul Food, The Biography of Spud Webb, Hell's Kitchen, NYC, Tears of a Clown, O (as the titular character Odin a.k.a. O), and the thriller Uninvited Guest (as Silk). He appeared in Impostor as well as Paid in Full, an urban classic, that has given him notorious recognition as he portrayed Mitch and director Curtis Hanson's 8 Mile, opposite Eminem. He is mentioned in the Grammy- and Academy Award-winning song "Lose Yourself" by Eminem.

In June 2011, Phifer starred alongside John Barrowman and Eve Myles as CIA agent Rex Matheson in Torchwood: Miracle Day, the fourth series of the BBC/Starz Entertainment TV show Torchwood. In December of that year, he also starred on Broadway in Lydia Diamond's Stick Fly.

Phifer starred as Agent Collins in the fourth season of White Collar.

He made a guest appearance on the sitcom series Husbands in its second season.

In Fall 2016, he joined the TV show Frequency as a series regular.

Personal life
Phifer has a son with his former wife, actress Malinda Williams. His second son was born to Oni Souratha in Los Angeles in 2007. On March 30, 2013, Phifer married his longtime girlfriend Reshelet Barnes in Beverly Hills, California.

Other activities
Phifer was the 2004 winner of the Celebrity Poker Showdown Championship, defeating Neil Patrick Harris during the fourth season. Phifer plays on the World Poker Tour in the Hollywood Home games for the Love Our Children USA charity. Phifer is chairman of the board of trustees of The Vine Group USA. a non-profit organization established in 2000 to provide educational resources to universities in Africa. He has signed up with Full Tilt Poker. He has his own well on the poker forum 2+2.

Phifer is an owner of a number of Athlete's Foot athletic shoe-store franchises in California.

In January 2011, Phifer launched Third Reel Films. The stated mission of the company is to provide an environment for filmmakers to showcase their work to entertainment representatives, acquisition executives, and other key-industry professionals.

Filmography

Film

Television

Music videos
1994: "Flava in Ya Ear" by Craig Mack
1996: "Wu Wear" by Wu-Tang Clan
1996: "So Many Ways" by The Braxtons
1996: "Nobody" by Keith Sweat featuring Athena Cage
1996: "Don't Let Go (Love)" by En Vogue
1998: "The Boy Is Mine" by Brandy and Monica
1999: "BOOM" by Royce da 5'9"
2002: "Lose Yourself" by Eminem
2003: "Many Men (Wish Death)" by 50 Cent
2003: "Without Me" by Eminem
2004: "Just Lose It" by Eminem

References

External links

1974 births
Living people
Male actors from New York City
American male film actors
American male television actors
People from Harlem
African-American male actors
20th-century American male actors
21st-century American male actors
20th-century African-American people
21st-century African-American people